"I've Had You" is a song by New Zealand musician Jenny Morris. It was released in November 1991 the second single from her third studio album, Honeychild (1991). The song reached number 39 in both New Zealand and Australia.

Track listing
Australian CD single
 "I've Had You"
 "Who Loves Ya Babe"
 "Piece of My Heart"
 "Break in the Weather" (Fresh mix)

Charts

References

Jenny Morris (musician) songs
1991 songs
1991 singles
East West Records singles
Songs written by Paul Kelly (Australian musician)